The following is a partial list of a few music artists who have released songs in the Irish language.

Modern music
 Aeons
 Altan
 Muireann Nic Amhlaoibh
 Anúna
 Autamata
 The Irish Roots Cafe house band
 Bell X1
 Wallis Bird
 Des Bishop
 Blink
 Luka Bloom
 Ross Breen
 Moya Brennan
 Kate Bush
 Paddy Casey
 The Chieftains
 Clannad
 Clann Zú
 The Coronas
 The Corrs
 Máirtín de Cógáin
 Delorentos
 Damien Dempsey
 Janet Devlin
 Tadhg Mac Dhonnagáin
 The Saw Doctors
 The Dubliners
 Enya
 Órla Fallon
 The Fuchsia Band
 Dingle White Females
 Fiach
 The Hothouse Flowers
 The Frames
 Dave Geraghty
 Meanscoil Gharman
 Gavin Glass
 The Guggenheim Grotto
 Lisa Hannigan
 Mickey Harte
 Gemma Hayes
 Heathers
 IMLÉ
 Bevel Jenny
 Sandie Jones
 Susan McKeown agus Róisín Chambers
 Maria Doyle Kennedy
 Kíla
 Jack L
 Mary Jane Lamond
 Lir
 Ashley MacIsaac
 The Mongrels
 Morgan The Bouncer
 Van Morrison
 Morgan is Mosney
 Mundy
 Mairéad Ní Mhaonaigh
 Mike O'Laughlin
 Declan O'Rourke
 Conor O'Tuama
 Q - OOH!
 The Pale
 Luan Parle
 Picturehouse
 Planxty
 Primordial
 Q (22)
 The Revs
 Roesy
 Rubberbandits
 Pauline Scanlon
 Seneca
 Seo Linn
 Slide
 Rónán Ó Snodaigh
Solas
 The Spikes
 John Spillane
 Claire Sproule
 The 4th State
 Sting
 Emmett Tinley
 Traic
Tuath
 The 4 of Us
 The Walls
 The Frank and Walters
 The Waterboys
 Ian Whitty
 Ger Wolfe
 Na Fíréin
 KNEECAP

See also

Gaelic Revival - Irish language revival
Gaelscoileanna  Irish-medium education
Gaelic broadcasting in Scotland 
List of Celtic-language media

External links
Seachtain na Gaeilge
Gaeilge.ie
Top 40 Oifigiúil na hÉireann
Giotaí
Gaelport
Irish language commissioner

Irish-language mass media
Irish-language
Irish-language songs